Loch Gilp (Scottish Gaelic: "Loch Gilb") is a small inlet on Loch Fyne which gives its name to Lochgilphead. The Crinan Canal extends from the loch across to Crinan itself.

References

Lochs of Argyll and Bute
Sea lochs of Scotland
Lochgilphead